William Leyden (February 1, 1917, in Chicago, Illinois – March 11, 1970, in Hollywood, California) was a television game show host and announcer who emceed six game shows, including It Could Be You (1956–61), Your First Impression (1962–64, with Dennis James), and You're Putting Me On (1969). In addition, he hosted movies on KTTV, and played small roles in a handful of films, including Jerry Lewis's The Patsy (1964).

During World War II Leyden served in the Marine Corps. After returning to Chicago  following the war, Leyden worked as an NBC page while getting a degree in Archaeology from DePaul University. Leyden started his broadcast career in Cleveland as a radio announcer. Then moved to LA and became a disc jockey on stations KMPC and KFWB in Los Angeles and later served as an announcer for the syndicated radio series The Liberace Program (1954–55) before moving over to television, where he hosted several game shows, the most successful of which was It Could Be You .  

During his run on It Could Be You, Leyden was touted by announcer Wendell Niles as "the man who will amaze you with what he knows about you", partly because Leyden was often helped onstage and in the audience by well-concealed TelePrompters and "a team of spies and operatives" who investigated potential contestants.

Although he was extremely popular, both in front of the camera and behind the microphone, Leyden's chronic health problems limited his on-screen work in the latter half of the 1960s. (Bill Cullen and Larry Blyden filled in for Leyden on You're Putting Me On, with Blyden becoming the permanent host of the show when Leyden suffered a cerebral hemorrhage in September 1969.  He died six months later at the age of 53. For his television work, Leyden received a star on the Hollywood Walk of Fame.

Game shows
You're Putting Me On (1969) - NBC
Super Bingo (1967) - syndicated
Let's Face It (1967) - syndicated
Call My Bluff (1965) - NBC
Your First Impression (1962-1964) - NBC
It Could Be You (1956-1961) - NBC - had both daytime and nighttime versions
Musical Chairs (1955) - NBC -summer series

References

External links

http://projects.latimes.com/hollywood/star-walk/bill-leyden/
https://billleyden.me/tag/bill-leyden/
https://www.findagrave.com/memorial/85906728
https://www.newspapers.com/newspage/129135373/
https://billleyden.me/?s=Bill+Leyden&submit=Search
https://web.archive.org/web/20160729091724/http://userdata.acd.net/ottinger/cullen/tvseries/youre.html
http://www.mcqueenonline.com/itcouldbeyou.htm

1917 births
1970 deaths
American game show hosts
United States Marine Corps personnel of World War II
United States Marines
People from Chicago